Oil City is an unincorporated community in Caroline County, Maryland, United States. It is located at the junction of Maryland routes 313 and 317.

References

Unincorporated communities in Caroline County, Maryland
Unincorporated communities in Maryland